Chris Darkins is a former running back in the National Football League (NFL).

Biography
Darkins was born Christopher Oji Darkins on April 30, 1974 in San Francisco, California.

Career
He attended high school at Strake Jesuit College Preparatory and played collegiately at the University of Minnesota. In 1994, he was awarded the Bronko Nagurski Award as the team's most valuable player.

Darkins (Football, 1992–95; Track, 1993–96) stood out in two sports during his time at the U of M, but the unifying factor in both was his unbelievable running abilities. On the gridiron, Darkins earned First-team All-Big Ten honors in 1994 by setting a school record with 1,443 rushing yards on the season. Darkins career rushing total of 3,235 yards was third on Minnesota's all-time list when his career ended and remains fifth-best in program history, and his 294 rushing yards against Purdue in 1995 is still the highest single-game total in Gopher football history. On the track, Darkins followed up a runner-up finish in the 55 meters at the 1995 Big Ten Championships with a Big Ten title in the 55 meters in 1996, establishing a school record time. Following his collegiate career, Darkins was drafted in the fourth round of the 1996 NFL Draft by the Green Bay Packers.

Darkins was a member of the 1996 Super Bowl Championship team and the 1997 NFC Championship team that lost to Denver in the Super Bowl.

Awards
In 1992 Darkins was inducted into the Strake Jesuit College Preparatory Hall of Honor for his accomplishments as a 4-year letter winner and member of championship teams in soccer and track as well as a 2-year letter winner as a football player. 
In 2015 Darkins was inducted into the University of Minnesota, one of the nation's oldest letter winning colleges, Hall of Fame for his accomplishments as two sport athlete in football and track. 
In 2019 Darkins was again inducted into the Strake Jesuit College Preparatory Hall of Honor as a member of the 1992 State Championship Soccer Team.

Wrongful Arrest and Activism
On Wednesday, February 24, 2016, Darkins was arrested in Houston, TX for his alleged role in a drug trafficking and money laundering ring. On May 2, 2017 all charges were dismissed against Darkins by U.S. District Court Judge Marc Thomas Treadwell for Want of Prosecution.

On Oct. 10th, 2018 Darkins was awarded a Congressional Certificate from the 18th District acknowledging that he was wrongfully accused and recognizing his work as a wrongful convictions activist.

See also
List of Green Bay Packers players

References

1974 births
Living people
Strake Jesuit College Preparatory alumni
Players of American football from San Francisco
Green Bay Packers players
American football running backs
University of Minnesota alumni
Minnesota Golden Gophers football players